Nightcrawlers: The KMFDM Remixes is a remix album released in 1992 by White Zombie through Geffen Records with remixes done by KMFDM.

Track listing

Personnel
 Ivan de Prume - drums
 Michael Golob - art direction
 Sascha Konietzko - tracks 2, 3, & 5
 Lee Popa - tracks 2 & 3 
 Andy Wallace - producer
 Sean Yseult - bass
 Rob Zombie - vocals, lyricist

White Zombie (band) albums
1992 EPs
Albums produced by Andy Wallace (producer)
1992 remix albums
Remix EPs
KMFDM albums
Geffen Records remix albums
Geffen Records EPs